Choaspes plateni, commonly known as the branded awlking, is a species of butterfly belonging to the family Hesperiidae. It is found in Asia. Known food plants include Meliosma (Meliosmaceae) and Pometia (Sapindaceae)

Range
The branded awlking is found in India (Sikkim, Assam), southern Myanmar (including Mergui), Malaysia, the Indonesian archipelago (including Borneo, Sumatra, Nias, Bangka, Palawan), Thailand, Laos, Vietnam and Hainan, China.

Status
Rare.

Cited references

See also
Coeliadinae
Hesperiidae
List of butterflies of India (Coeliadinae)
List of butterflies of India (Hesperiidae)

References
Print

Online

Brower, Andrew V. Z., (2007). Choaspes Moore 1881. Version 21 February 2007 (under construction). Page on genus Choaspes in The Tree of Life Web Project http://tolweb.org/.

Coeliadinae
Butterflies of Asia
Butterflies described in 1888